Chenanisaurus is a genus of predatory abelisaurid dinosaur, with a single known species C. barbaricus. It comes from the upper Maastrichtian phosphates of the Ouled Abdoun Basin in Morocco, North Africa. The animal is known from a holotype, consisting of a partial jaw bone, and several isolated teeth found in the same beds. Chenanisaurus is one of the largest members of the Abelisauridae, and one of the last, being a contemporary of the North American Tyrannosaurus. It would have been among the dinosaur species wiped out by the Chicxulub asteroid impact and the Cretaceous-Paleogene mass extinction that followed.

Description  

Its size is comparable to that of large abelisaurids such as Carnotaurus and Pycnonemosaurus.

Nicholas R. Longrich and colleagues, the describers of Chenanisaurus, identified distinctive features distinguishing the animal from other abelisaurid species. The lower jaw is high, while the dentary is bent in side view. The lateral groove and associated foramina are located high on the outer surface of the dentary. The anterodorsal margin of the dentary is curved downward. The symphysis of the lower jaws is heavily built while the leading edge is vertical in side view. The front jaw points are wide in plan view, encountering each other at an obtuse angle.

The most striking feature of the mandible is the extreme height, especially when compared with the relatively short teeth. This seems to indicate that the jaw is also very short, with a build even more extreme than seen in the related Carnotaurus. This suggests the jaws were built to withstand a high bite force. The jaw flexes forwardly downwards to terminate in a deep blunt point. At the back there is a deep high furrow above it with a row of foramina that open towards the top in a series of vertical grooves. The high position is a basal characteristic. The outer lower side shows an ornamentation of pits and interweaved ridges. The front interdental plates are very high but they quickly lower towards the rear of the jaw. The tooth sockets are rectangular in upper view. The jaw carries at least ten teeth. These are relatively slender, but the front teeth have a D-shaped cross section with the convexity facing outward; the rear teeth are dagger-shaped and more flattened. The cutting edges are convex and show up to thirteen denticles per five millimetres at the crown base, and up to eight denticles near the apex. They have small blood grooves. The enamel has an irregular structure without clear ornamentation.

Discovery and naming

The holotype is labelled as OCP DEK-GE 772. Individual teeth collected from the surrounding area, two premaxillary teeth labelled as OCP DEK-GE 457 and DEK-GE 458 and the maxillary tooth WDC-CCPM-005 already described in 2005, were referred to Chenanisaurus due to their similarity to the teeth of the holotype. Chenanisaurus is named after the Sidi Chennane mines where it was discovered and its specific name of barbaricus translates as "barbaric" and refers to Barbary. Its discovery came as a surprise, because the rocks that produced the jaw were marine and primarily produced marine reptiles, not dinosaurs.

Classification
In 2017, Chenanisaurus was placed in Abelisauridae in a basal position outside the Abelisaurinae and Carnotaurinae. Though it resembles carnotaurine abelisaurids in aspects of its jaw morphology, Chenanisaurus may belong to an as-yet undescribed group of abelisaurids unique to Africa. Only further research will determine the true relations of this species.

Paleobiology  

Chenanisaurus was a predator, like other abelisaurids. Given its size, it could have hunted relatively large prey. The lower jaw suggests a relatively short powerfully built head and jaws. Along with the large size of the animal, the proportions of the jaws would have given it a powerful bite force, suggesting the ability to prey on relatively large dinosaurs.  

Titanosaurian sauropods have been found in the same beds, along with the small hadrosaurid Ajnabia odysseus and were likely prey for Chenanisaurus.  

The presence of Chenanisaurus in the phosphates is unusual because the phosphates represent a marine environment. Most of the fossils known from these beds are therefore marine animals, such as sharks, fish, mosasaurs, and plesiosaurs. The presence of Chenanisaurus in these beds is therefore surprising. It is possible that some animals died and were washed out to sea by rivers; it is also possible that Chenanisaurus sometimes entered the ocean to swim. 

Other Gondwanan continents, such as South America, India, and Madagascar show a similar combination of titanosaurians and abelisaurids in the latest Cretaceous, suggesting a distinct evolutionary history from the Laurasian continents of Asia and North America.

The finding of Chenanisaurus and these fragments of titanosaurids also indicate that in Africa, an abelisaurid/titanosaur fauna existed just prior to the Cretaceous–Paleogene extinction event, suggesting that the faunal assemblage of Gondwana was relatively stable until that point in time. Chenanisaurus' remains were found in marine deposits that comprise most of the Sidi Chennane phosphate mines, indicating that post-mortem, the theropod had washed out to sea, where the holotype specimen became fossilized.

See also
 Timeline of ceratosaur research
2017 in archosaur paleontology

References 

Abelisaurids
Late Cretaceous dinosaurs of Africa
Fossil taxa described in 2017